is a fictional character from Namco's Tekken fighting game series. A cold-blooded Irish professional assassin, Nina made her first appearance in Tekken, the original game in the series. in the series. Notably, Nina is one of the two playable characters (the other only being Paul Phoenix) and the sole female character to appear in all main installments in the series. She also starred in her own spin-off game, Death by Degrees.

Nina has an unstable and often violent relationship with her younger sister, Anna Williams, who is frequently her arch-rival in the series. She is known for her fast and lethal fighting style, based loosely on the fighting arts Jujutsu and Koppojutsu, among others.

Nina was mostly very well received, often regarded as one of the best Tekken characters and is perhaps the most famous female fighter in the Tekken series.

Appearances

In video games
Nina Williams is the first-born daughter of an Irish father, former assassin Richard Williams, and a British mother in Ireland, Heather Williams, as was her sister, Anna. From a young age, both Nina, and Anna, were taught various forms of martial arts such as assassination martial arts, Jujutsu and koppojutsu. Both sisters admired their father, which spawned a sibling rivalry between the two as they craved and competed for his attention. When Richard died, both sisters blamed each other as the cause of his death. Although they tried to maintain their relationship following their father's last wish, it only made their rivalry strengthen even further. Nina's training in the assassination martial arts helped her to quickly become an assassin for-hire. The 20-year-old Nina had later been hired during The King of Iron Fist Tournament to assassinate the head of Mishima Zaibatsu, Heihachi Mishima. However, she failed when she was defeated by Anna.

Two years later, Nina was contracted again to assassinate the current head of Mishima Zaibatsu, Kazuya Mishima, by entering The King of Iron Fist Tournament 2, but Anna intervened and was defeated by her, as a result a conflict prevented her from fulfilling the assignment. Nina was captured by Kazuya after failing to assassinate him and was used as a test subject in the "cold sleep" project by Dr. Bosconovitch - a cryogenic experiment. Anna was also captured by Kazuya and put in cryogenic sleep, the experiment went on for 15 years.

When Nina woke up from the cryosleep, she suffered heavy amnesia, a fate from which her sister Anna was spared. She was also controlled by the recently awakened Ogre, the God of Fighting who sent her to participate in The King of Iron Fist Tournament 3 to assassinate Jin Kazama, - Heihachi Mishima's grandson. Near the end of the tournament, Jin managed to beat Nina back to her senses, allowing her to break free from Ogre's control. As an act of compassion, Anna wanted to end Nina's job of an assassin, however wanted to continue their rivalry. So Anna worked intensively with Dr. Bosconovitch to bring her sister's memories back. However, the project failed when Nina recovered the memory about the fact that she and her sister did not get along. After this, Nina left and did not contact Anna for some time.

Nina soon revived her role as an assassin, the only other memory that she recalled from her previous life. Two years later, she was contracted by a Mafia syndicate to kill a famous British boxer, Steve Fox. However, she discovered that Steve was in fact her biological son, who was born through in vitro fertilisation during her years in cryosleep. With her genes, Doctor Abel conducted a Hybrid Gene experiment creating children, including Steve, until the experiment was cancelled after most of children died during that experiment, except  for Steve and one of the surviving children, whose statuses were covered by the former Zaibatsu, now G Corporation researcher, Emma Kliesen, (Leo's mother) from being watched by the Zaibatsu's eyes. At the last moment when she tried to pull the trigger to her rifle, she somehow and rarely regained her human emotions, and refused to kill Fox. Nina abandoned her assassination attempt after detective Lei Wulong brought down the syndicate. After the collapse of her employers, Nina no longer possessed a viable reason to pursue her target. It was also revealed that she remained emotionally impassive about the discovery of her biological son, but the fact that she did not kill him when the chance presented itself shows otherwise for some.

Nina decided that it was time that she re-discovered her lost memories and came to the conclusion that the only person who could help her was her sister, Anna Williams. Anna met with Nina soon after. However, Nina's memories and hatred instinctively returned, and they rapidly engaged in a brawling duel. The duel lasted for days in a stalemate and the two later agreed to meet at The King of Iron Fist Tournament 5 to finish their battle. The two promised that only one would walk away from the coming battle, however, after Nina's victory, she refused to take Anna's life as their fight was not satisfactory.

Later, Nina was approached by the Mishima Zaibatsu's new CEO, Jin Kazama, who had already launched war around the world, to be his personal bodyguard. Nina accepted and entered The King of Iron Fist Tournament 6 to intercept any possible threat to him. Meanwhile, Anna, vowed to take revenge on Nina and became Kazuya Mishima's personal bodyguard, with the belief that she was bound to come face to face with Nina along the way. In the Scenario Campaign mode of the console version of Tekken 6, Nina served as one of the antagonists, assisting Jin at his scheme. After Jin sacrificed himself to kill Azazel at the end, Nina told Lars that she already knew of Jin's plans about the world war since the beginning: so he can awaken Azazel's physical body, but she was unsure of whether Jin's actions were right or wrong. Nina then left with a Mishima Zaibatsu helicopter, which may or may not signify that she became Mishima Zaibatsu's temporary new CEO during Jin's disappearance.

Nina did not appear in Tekken 7s original arcade release, but Nina returned in its updated title, Tekken 7: Fated Retribution. In the story mode, she was forced to work for the returning Heihachi in the first-half, until she began to have concerns about Lars' good reason to keep Jin safe with him, and deemed it very interesting to watch. She resigned from the Zaibatsu, faked her death, then set her private assassination job for hire. She was later tasked with infiltrating a mafia wedding which happened to be held by G Corpotation, and posed as the bride, while the real bride of the mafia happened to be her sister Anna, whom Nina stole the wedding dress from. Although she succeeded in murdering Anna's groom, Nina was somehow pursued by her son Steve, and the Tekken Force as well Anna and the fellow G Corporation mafia themselves. However, encountering Steve will give her a best opportunity to escape. Eventually in Steve's ending, continued from his Tag 2 ending finally revealed that when she was put to cryosleep between Tekken 2 and 3, Mishima Zaibatsu, while under Heihachi's leadership attempted to use her genes to create child super soldiers that could fit the Devil Gene project for the organization army. Steve is one of the survivors thanks to the cover by the now late-Doctor Emma Kliesen.

Nina stars in her own action game, Death by Degrees, released in 2005. The game provides an alternate backstory for Nina and Anna; the plot concentrating more on their father and how he died when they were children. In this game it is revealed that Richard Williams had struggled with a few guardsmen, and shouted for Nina to grab a gun which one of guardsmen had dropped. However, her hesitation and fear caused the guards to get the upper hand and shoot Richard Williams, killing him. Anna is shown comforting her sister moments after, while the older Nina looks over the scene. The rivalry which stemmed from the incident crossed over to the real-time events of the Tekken series.

Nina also appears in the 2012 crossover fighting game Street Fighter X Tekken with her official tag partner, Kazuya. In the cinematic trailer, they battle against Ryu and Ken at a condemned building, before Kazuya captures Ryu as bait to lure Jin out.

Design and gameplay
According to Namco's Tekken original design team, "it was Nina or Kazuya who was the soul, the cool part, of the [first] game." Producer Yozo Sakagami said about their choice of Roberto Ferrari as her character designer, "Nina is a white character, and as you can see with games like Final Fantasy, when Japanese artists try to design white women or whatever, [the characters] kind of turn Japanese in their facial features and just the way they look, generally. And we didn't want that with Nina."

Nina has a blonde ponytail, blue eyes, and a slim hourglass figure, yet a powerful build. Her look contrasts that of her younger sister, Anna, who is a brunette. She dresses primarily in purple fitted costumes and is commonly seen wearing a military style outfit (to suit her occupation), sometimes also in costumes made of materials resembling spandex, PVC and leather; she was barefoot in the first game but most often, she wears stiletto heels (a nod to her assassin motif). In Tekken 6, one of Nina's extra outfits is one of her Death by Degrees costumes. Her default costume in Tekken 7 is Anna's stolen wedding gown: off-white, burned and tattered, long strapless wedding gown and veil, white gloves and stockings, and white stilettos.  Nina also has an alternate costume called Summer Nina''' which appeared in Tekken Mobile.

Nina is known for her lethal grappling techniques and counterattacks. She also has a versatile repertoire of striking attacks with all limbs; Anna shares many moves with her. Nina was also among the first characters to utilize chain throws, having them since Tekken 2 where she was recommended for aggressive players. In Tekken Tag Tournament, she was noted as "feared by many players" due to her many combos that are difficult to counter, but her command list has a high execution barrier; she is a challenge, requiring a lot of practice to master. In Tekken 6, she has strong jabbing abilities, is agile and has above average strength. In Tekken 7, her Rage Art shows how agile she is. In Rage Art, she climbs on the opponent's shoulder, uses her thighs to grab the  opponent's neck and continuously spins to dodge the opponent's feedback. Then she grabs the opponent's neck again by her thighs and slam it down to the ground, uses her thigh muscles to break the opponent's neck.

Other appearances
Nina also appears in the OVA Tekken: The Motion Picture as one of the main villains. She is seduced by Lee Chaolan and he hires her to kill Kazuya Mishima so that he will inherit the Mishima Zaibatsu from Heihachi. Nina attempts many times to assassinate Kazuya, but he keeps foiling her with his superior skills. Her rivalry with Anna is also present, although it differs from the games in the sense that Nina was favored by their father, who Anna killed out of resentment. Eventually, Nina fights Anna somewhere on the island where the tournament is being held. As Anna is ambushed and devoured by a biologically enhanced dinosaur-like being (similar in appearance to Alex), Nina flees. She is last seen among the other fighters who made it off the island before it explodes, but with Lee's death and Heihachi fleeing, she abandons her contract against Kazuya.

Nina Williams was portrayed by South African model and singer Candîce Hillebrand in the 2009 film adaptation, Tekken. In the film, she is a participant in the Iron Fist tournament, yet serves as an assassin under Kazuya along with Anna. Both of them are also Kazuya's lovers. Kazuya sends Nina and Anna to assassinate Jin Kazama, but the ensuing fight attracts Christie Monteiro's attention and Nina and Anna flee. In the next round, Jin recognizes Nina as one of the assassins, and Christie takes her revenge on Nina by beating her soundly in the ring. She returns when Kazuya order his soldiers to arrest the fighters. Nina is seen in one of the cells with Anna and Dragunov. Unlike the games, she and Anna are on good terms and has no relation to Steve Fox.

Nina also appears in the animated film Tekken: Blood Vengeance. In its beginning, she rides a motorcycle while fighting Anna. Despite being cornered, she still manages to escape and is sent to Russia by Jin to find Alisa Bosconovitch. She once again appears after Xiaoyu and Alisa escape from Anna. Anna attempts to capture Nina, amusing Lee.

Summer Daniels portrayed Nina in the Tekken Tag Tournament 2 live-action trailer "Girl Power" in 2012. In 1998, Epoch Co. released a 1/10 scale Nina action figure based on her appearance in Tekken 3, including two plastic swords and one plastic gun. An action figure based on her appearance from Tekken 5 was released in 2006; two figures based on her appearance in Death by Degrees were also released that same year. Kotabukiya released a bishoujo figure of Nina from Tag Tournament 2 designed by Shunya Yamashita for the 20th anniversary of Tekken in 2014. Nina appears as a Spirit in the Nintendo crossover video game Super Smash Bros. Ultimate.

Reception
The character was received mostly very positively. Gaming Target listed the "world's sexiest assassin" Nina Williams as the fifth best Tekken character in 2006. Complex ranked this "ultimate ice queen" as the second best Tekken character in 2013 for her "huge arsenal of pokes at her disposal, not to mention chain throws and combo launchers." In an official poll by Namco, Nina ranked as the 14th most requested Tekken character to be playable in Tekken X Street Fighter.

Nina Williams was chosen as one of the 20 "muses" of video games by Brazilian magazine SuperGamePower in 2001 and as the number one Namco muse by Dicas & Truques para PlayStation in 2004. In 2007, Tom's Games listed Nina among the 50 greatest female characters in video game history, commenting that "she has without a doubt one of the best bodies in the business". In QMI Agency's 2012 poll "ultimate fighting champion", Nina beat Dead or Alive's Kasumi and Virtua Fighter's Pai Chan, before losing to Mortal Kombat's Liu Kang. In 2014, What Culture ranked Nina as the 12th greatest ever fighting game character, opining she "isn’t overtly sexualised in the same way that, say, Taki and Ivy from SoulCalibur are," and regarding her as among the strongest female video game characters.

Nina was often noted for sex appeal. Readers of German magazine Mega Fun and of Polish edition of GameStar had her voted at third place for the "Video Game Babe of 1998" award and fifth in the 2006 poll for the title of "Miss of the Video Game World", respectively. She was voted the "Hottest Female Fighting Character" in a 2008 poll by Guinness World Records Gamer's Edition, also previously being voted number one in the "Hot" category by readers of French magazine Consoles + in 2004.

She has been placed on many lists of most attractive female game characters, including being placed sixth by GameTrailers in 2007, 30th by GameDaily in 2008, 17th by UGO in 2011, 20th by Gadget Review in 2012, and 15th by GameHall's Portal PlayGame in 2014. Maxim listed Nina among the top nine "video game vixens" in 2009, complimenting her costumes and her running around with a katana with very high heels in Death by Degrees as "frightening and erotic at the same time," and she was also showcased on a similar list by Polish magazine Fakt in 2013. MSN included her among the 20 "hottest women in video game history" in 2012, adding that "she became hotter and hotter as graphics technology improved," while Interia.pl included Nina among the "sexiest game female characters" of that year.PLAY ranked her as second top "hottest" blonde in games in 2010, adding that she "was sexy even back when her hair was made out of about eight polygons," while Gadżetomania.pl ranked her as number one top "sexiest and fierce" blonde in games. In addition, she was included in GameDaily's top list of hottest blondes in video games, for having both "a killer body" and a killer instinct. Lisa Foiles of The Escapist put her among the top five "hottest blonde chicks" in 2011, stating her preference of Nina over many other fighting game blondes (such as Cammy, Jill Valentine, Sarah Bryant, Sophitia and Tina Armstrong), as well as her sister Anna, and noting Nina's resemblance to Capcom's Jill Valentine in Resident Evil 5.

G4 included Nina among her the best assassins in all video games in 2004. In 2011, Joystick Division ranked Nina as the second most "badass" Irish character in video games and PlayStation Official Magazine listed her among "PlayStation’s meanest mothers". FHM listed a fight between Nina and Poison as one of the ten "awesome fantasy fights" in Street Fighter X Tekken, as "hot girls fighting is always a spectacle to see, and these two represent the sauciest for both franchises." Caroline O'Donoghue from The Guardian considers Nina their favorite Tekken character, and deems her to be "overlooked" when it comes to "classic female video games characters." O'Donoghue went on to state "It wasn't just that she was Irish – although I remember gasping the moment I read that in the Tekken 2 booklet, it being the first time I had anything in common with a woman from a video game – it was that I felt as if I knew things about her."

However, the Official U.S. PlayStation Magazine called the Death by Degrees Nina as an "overrated" spin-off character in comparison to Whiplash protagonist Spanx. GameDaily listed Nina's appearance in Death by Degrees as one of her worst moments, citing the game's poor gameplay and below-average graphics.

See also
List of Tekken characters

References

External links

 (Death by Degrees'')

Action film characters
Ansatsuken
Cryonically preserved characters in video games
Female characters in video games
Female video game villains
Fictional aikidoka
Fictional assassins in video games
Fictional British people in video games
Fictional bodyguards in video games
Fictional SIS agents
Fictional female martial artists
Fictional hapkido practitioners
Fictional Irish people in video games
Fictional martial artists in video games
Fictional kenjutsuka
Fictional mercenaries in video games
Fictional Ninjutsu practitioners
Fictional Systema practitioners
Fictional Taido practitioners
Namco protagonists
Namco antagonists
Tekken characters
Woman soldier and warrior characters in video games
Video game bosses
Video game characters introduced in 1994